Cavedigger is a 2013 documentary film by Jeffrey Karoff.

Synopsis
This film is the story of Ra Paulette, a man who obsessively digs massive, ornately carved, sandstone caves in Northern New Mexico as art. These works are commissioned by patrons, who envision smaller scale projects, but Paulette often take years to finish, and artistic conflict ensues over money and the scope of the project. All of his caves are created by using just hand tools. The story is the classic battle of how one knows when an artistic project is finished. At the end of the film, we see Paulette start his magnum opus, a cave he expects to take the last 10 years of his life, on unauthorized land, and in secret.  The public can book a docent-led tour by appointment, to "The Windows of the Earth" cave sanctuary -featured in the Cave Digger documentary. The resort and retreat venue, Origin at Rancho de San Juan, allows for the only opportunity for public viewing of one this man's amazing "land art" creations.

Awards

See also
 Ra Paulette

References

External links
 
 
 Cavedigger at Journeyman Pictures
 Interview with Director Jeffrey Karoff at Every Oscar Ever

2013 films
2013 short documentary films
American short documentary films